Ilkin Qirtimov (born  4 November 1990, in Zaqatala) is an Azerbaijani footballer who plays for Gabala in the Azerbaijan Premier League.

Club career
Ilkin Qirtimov began playing football during his school years in Zaqatala under the guidance of Shaban Shirdanov. In 2008, he signed a contract with Simurq PFC and began to play at Simurqs youth system. He made his debut in the Azerbaijan Premier League in 2010. The contract was renewed in 2011.

On 9 January 2018, Neftchi Baku announced the signing of Qirtimov on a contract until the end of the 2017–18 season.

On 8 July 2019, Qirtimov returned to Keşla FK, signing a one-year contract.

On 23 May 2022, Gabala announced the signing of Qirtimov on a one-year contract.

Career statistics

Club

International

Statistics accurate as of match played 10 October 2014

References

1990 births
Living people
Azerbaijani footballers
Azerbaijan international footballers
Simurq PIK players
Shamakhi FK players
Zira FK players
Association football defenders
People from Zaqatala
Neftçi PFK players